Ingelsträde is a locality situated in Höganäs Municipality, Skåne County, Sweden with 241 inhabitants in 2010.

References 

Populated places in Höganäs Municipality
Populated places in Skåne County